Eli Lotar (born Eliazar Lotar Teodorescu; January 30, 1905 – May 10, 1969) was a French photographer and cinematographer.

Lotar was born in Paris, the son of Tudor Arghezi, a Romanian poet, and Constanța Zissu, a teacher. He became a French citizen in 1926 and met the German photographer Germaine Krull. He took part in many exhibitions with Krull and photographer André Kertész. 

Lotar published his photographs in reviews such as Jazz, Variétés, Bifur, and Documents. His reportage on the Parisian La Villette's slaughterhouses (1929, issue 6) was a theme very much in line with Georges Bataille's interests in sacrificial rituals and became one of his best-known works.

Lotar also frequented cinematic and theatrical circles, through which he met filmmakers René Clair and Luis Buñuel, theater director Antonin Artaud and playwright Roger Vitrac. Lotar was the cinematographer on Buñuel's Las Hurdes: Tierra Sin Pan. A member of the Groupe Octobre, Lotar worked with filmmakers such as Jacques Brunius, Joris Ivens, Jean Painlevé, and Jean Renoir, as a set photographer or as a cameraman. He assisted Marc Allégret and directed  three films, one of which, Aubervilliers (1946), was selected for the Cannes Film Festival in 1946. 

During his last years, which were particularly somber, he became close friends with Alberto Giacometti and posed for several of his sculptures.

References

External links

1905 births
1969 deaths
French photojournalists
French people of Romanian descent